Jeffrey Henderson (born February 19, 1989) is an American track and field athlete who competes in the long jump and 100-meter dash. At the long jump at the 2016 Summer Olympics, Henderson captured gold for Team USA, its first in the event since 2004. Henderson added a silver medal at the 2019 outdoor world championships. Other top results include becoming the 2014, 2016 and 2018 USA Outdoor national long jump champion.

Career
Henderson was raised in McAlmont, Arkansas. While attending Sylvan Hills High School, he won the long jump at the 2007 Arkansas Activities Association Class 6A state high school track and field championships with a  jump, followed by a  jump at the 2007 Arkansas Meet of Champions (MOC) high school meet. Since 2007, he maintains the state high school decathlon record in the 100-meter dash with his 10.84 seconds run. He previously held the Arkansas MOC record in the triple jump with a   leap.

He went on to study at Hinds Community College, Florida Memorial University and Stillman College where he competed for the Hinds CC Eagles, Florida Memorial Lions and Stillman Tigers track teams. At Hinds CC, Henderson became the NJCAA Division 1 2008 indoor national champion (long jump), 2008 outdoor national champion (long jump, 100 meters), and 2009 outdoor national champion (long jump and 4x100 meter relay team).

After finishing second in the long jump  at the 2010 USA Indoor Track and Field Championships, Henderson competed at the 2010 IAAF World Indoor Championships, where he finished in 20th place with a  jump.

In his junior year at Stillman College, he earned All-America honors at the 2013 NCAA Division II Men's Outdoor Track and Field Championships by winning the 100-meter dash and long jump titles.

At the 2013 USA Outdoor Track and Field Championships, Henderson won the silver medal in the long jump with a  jump and represented the United States at the 2013 World Championships in Athletics in Moscow, Russia. Henderson competed in the long jump at the 2014 IAAF World Indoor Championships.

At the 2014 adidas Grand Prix, Henderson set a new meeting record in the men's long jump, leaping . He also jumped , however it was wind-aided at +3.5 m/s. After winning the Glasgow Grand Prix, Henderson is a 3-time 2014 IAAF Diamond League winner in the men's long jump.

At the 2015 USA Outdoor Track and Field Championships, Henderson jumped  to earn a silver medal. He had previously jumped , but the jump was not counted as it was wind-aided (+4.1 m/s). At the 2015 World Championships in Athletics – Men's long jump, he jumped  in the prelim to advance to the final, and jumped  in the final to place 8th.

At the 2016 United States Olympic Trials (track and field), Henderson took first place in the long jump with w and took first place with a  leap and edge past Luvo Manyonga (8.37 m) of South Africa by 1 centimeter in the long jump at the 2016 Summer Olympics. He dedicated his victory to his mother, who has Alzheimer's disease.

Henderson jumped  to place 5th in the long jump at the 2017 USA Outdoor Track and Field Championships to qualify to the long jump event at the 2017 IAAF World Championships where he placed 17th jumping .

Henderson jumped  to place 1st in the long jump at the 2018 USA Outdoor Track and Field Championships to qualify to long jump at the 2018 IAAF Continental Cup and placed 3rd jumping  this result helped the U.S. team to win the global challenge. At the 2018 IAAF Diamond League Final, he jumped  to place 5th.

References

External links

Living people
1989 births
Sylvan Hills High School alumni
American male long jumpers
American male sprinters
African-American male track and field athletes
People from Sherwood, Arkansas
Track and field athletes from Arkansas
Athletes (track and field) at the 2015 Pan American Games
Pan American Games gold medalists for the United States
Pan American Games medalists in athletics (track and field)
World Athletics Championships athletes for the United States
World Athletics Championships medalists
Athletes (track and field) at the 2016 Summer Olympics
Olympic gold medalists for the United States in track and field
Medalists at the 2016 Summer Olympics
Stillman College alumni
Olympic male long jumpers
USA Outdoor Track and Field Championships winners
Medalists at the 2015 Pan American Games
21st-century African-American sportspeople
20th-century African-American people